William Stein Newman (April 6, 1912 – April 27, 2000) was an American musicologist.

He was born in Cleveland, Ohio. From 1945 he taught at the University of North Carolina at Chapel Hill. He is best remembered for his three volume History of the Sonata Idea, a study of the term "sonata" comprising The Sonata in the Baroque Era, The Sonata in the Classical Era and The Sonata Since Beethoven. He also wrote on performance practice.

His textbook, Understanding Music, is perhaps the most thoroughgoing text on music appreciation in the English language.

Newman was initiated as an honorary member of Phi Mu Alpha Sinfonia by the Alpha Rho chapter in May 1963.

Newman died in Chapel Hill, North Carolina.

Philip F. Gura, a professor at the University of North Carolina at Chapel Hill, is the William S. Newman Distinguished Professor of American Literature and Culture. A concert series at UNC-Chapel Hill is named in his honor.

His intense interests extended from pugilism (specifically, boxing), to hands-on involvement with sports cars, and, of course, the Chopin Études and the Beethoven Sonatas. Pianists should read his The Pianist's Problems.

Beethoven scholars
1912 births
2000 deaths
20th-century American historians
People from Cleveland
20th-century American musicologists